Dorymyrmex (also known as cone ants) is a genus of ants in the subfamily Dolichoderinae.

Distribution and habitat 
This genus has a strictly American distribution, inhabiting in the Nearctic and Neotropical regions and containing 60 species, several undescribed. Despite being considered by many ant collectors as "road side weeds", several species of Dorymyrmex shown a high degree of endemicity, specialized habitat preferences, and varied population structure. Some species may serve as potential agents of biological control of annual crop pests. Species of Dorymyrmex nest preferentially in dry or disturbed habitats, generally in soil without vegetation cover. Several species are known to attend aphids and other hemipterous insects. Such behavior is common in other Dolichoderinae genera and related subfamilies.

Species

Dorymyrmex agallardoi Snelling, 1975
Dorymyrmex alboniger Forel, 1914
Dorymyrmex amazonicus Cuezzo & Guerrero, 2011
Dorymyrmex antarcticus Forel, 1904
Dorymyrmex antillana Snelling, 2005
Dorymyrmex baeri André, 1903
Dorymyrmex bicolor Wheeler, 1906
Dorymyrmex biconis Forel, 1912
Dorymyrmex bituber Santschi, 1916
Dorymyrmex bossutus (Trager, 1988)
Dorymyrmex breviscapis Forel, 1912
Dorymyrmex bruchi Forel, 1912
Dorymyrmex brunneus Forel, 1908
Dorymyrmex bureni (Trager, 1988)
Dorymyrmex carettei Forel, 1913
Dorymyrmex caretteoides Forel, 1914
Dorymyrmex chilensis Forel, 1911
Dorymyrmex confusus (Kusnezov, 1952)
Dorymyrmex coniculus Santschi, 1922
Dorymyrmex ebeninus Forel, 1914
Dorymyrmex elegans (Trager, 1988)
Dorymyrmex emmaericaellus Kusnezov, 1951
Dorymyrmex ensifer Forel, 1912
Dorymyrmex exsanguis Forel, 1912
Dorymyrmex flavescens Mayr, 1866
Dorymyrmex flavopectus Smith, 1944
Dorymyrmex flavus [no authors], 1879
Dorymyrmex fusculus Santschi, 1922
Dorymyrmex goeldii Forel, 1904
Dorymyrmex goetschi Goetsch, 1933
Dorymyrmex grandulus (Forel, 1922)
Dorymyrmex hunti (Snelling, 1975)
Dorymyrmex hypocritus (Snelling, 1975)
Dorymyrmex incomptus (Snelling, 1975)
Dorymyrmex insanus (Buckley, 1866)
Dorymyrmex jheringi Forel, 1912
Dorymyrmex joergenseni Bruch, 1917
Dorymyrmex lipan Snelling, 1995
Dorymyrmex minutus Emery, 1895
Dorymyrmex morenoi Bruch, 1921
Dorymyrmex paiute Snelling, 1995
Dorymyrmex pappodes (Snelling, 1975)
Dorymyrmex paranensis Santschi, 1922
Dorymyrmex planidens Mayr, 1868
Dorymyrmex pogonius (Snelling, 1975)
Dorymyrmex pulchellus Santschi, 1922
Dorymyrmex pyramicus (Roger, 1863)
Dorymyrmex reginicula (Trager, 1988)
Dorymyrmex richteri Forel, 1911
Dorymyrmex santschii Gallardo, 1917
Dorymyrmex silvestrii Gallardo, 1916
Dorymyrmex smithi Cole, 1936
Dorymyrmex spurius Santschi, 1929
Dorymyrmex steigeri Santschi, 1912
Dorymyrmex tener Mayr, 1868
Dorymyrmex thoracicus Gallardo, 1916
Dorymyrmex tuberosus Cuezzo & Guerrero, 2011
Dorymyrmex wheeleri (Kusnezov, 1952)
Dorymyrmex wolffhuegeli Forel, 1911
Dorymyrmex xerophylus Cuezzo & Guerrero, 2011

References

External links

 
Dolichoderinae
Ant genera
Hymenoptera of North America
Hymenoptera of South America
Taxa named by Gustav Mayr